The 2016 Melaka United season was 93rd season in club history and 1st season in the Malaysia Premier League since relegated of the league in 2010 season.

Background

Background information 
Melaka United won their first consecutive Malaysia FAM League championship in the 2015 season and promote to Malaysia Premier League in the 2016 season. Melaka United were knocked out of the 2015 Malaysia FA Cup in the first round by Terengganu.

Melaka United is preparing big budget for this season in order to achieve better position.

Transfer 
Melaka United announced an addition of three import players to strengthen the squad. The players are Labinot Harbuzi from Sweden, Shin Jae Pil from South Korea and Ilija Spasojević from Montenegro. 14 local players transferred to Melaka United.

Management team

Club personnel

Kit
 Supplier: Kronos 
 Main sponsors: Edra & Mamee
 Other sponsors: Restoran Melayu, Hatten Groups

Squads

First-team squad

Reserve squad

Out on loan

Friendly matches

Competitions

Overall

Overview

Malaysia Premier League

Table

Results summary

Results by round

Malaysia Premier League fixtures and results
Source:

Results overview

Scoring

Top scorers in 2016 Malaysia Premier League

Malaysia FA Cup

Malaysia Cup

Group stage

Scoring

Top scorers in 2016 Malaysia Cup

Squad statistics

Appearances and goals 

|-
! colspan="12" style="background:#dcdcdc; text-align:center"| Goalkeepers

|-
! colspan="12" style="background:#dcdcdc; text-align:center"| Defenders

|-
! colspan="12" style="background:#dcdcdc; text-align:center"| Midfielders

|-
! colspan="12" style="background:#dcdcdc; text-align:center"| Forwards

|-
! colspan="12" style="background:#dcdcdc; text-align:center"| Players transferred out during the season

Goalkeeper statistics 

Last updated: 21 May 2016

Discipline

Cards

Transfers

Early season

In

Out

Mid-season

In

Out

References

Melaka United F.C.
Melaka United F.C. seasons
Malaysian football clubs 2016 season
Malaysian football club seasons by club